Kharagwas is a village in Rewari mandal of Rewari district, in the Indian state of Haryana.

Adjacent villages
Kaluwas
Chandawas
Saharanwas
Budhpur

References

Villages in Rewari district